The following highways are numbered 717:

Costa Rica
 National Route 717

United States